Ana Roqué de Duprey, also known as "Flor del Valle" (Flower of the Valley) for her work in botany, (April 18, 1853 – 1933), was an educator, suffragist and one of the founders of the University of Puerto Rico.

Early years
Roqué (birth name: Ana Roqué Geigel) was born in Aguadilla, Puerto Rico. She lived among books and had learned how to write by the age of three. Her mother died when she was only 4 years old and she was raised by her father, aunt, and grandmother, who were all educators.  In 1860, when Roqué was seven years old, she was sent to a regular school, and two years later graduated.  She continued her homeschooling and in 1864 at the age of eleven, became the youngest teacher's assistant in Puerto Rico.  In 1866, at age 13, she founded a school in her house.  She also wrote a geography textbook for her students, which was later adopted by the Department of Education of Puerto Rico.  She applied for her teacher's license and passed the examinations.

First Puerto Rican woman to become a member of the Public Library
In 1872, she married Luis Duprey, a well-to-do landowner who was involved in politics. At the time of their marriage, Duprey was a slaveowner, and one of Roqué's conditions to marriage was that she be able to educate the slaves. She developed an interest in the politics of Puerto Rico. With Duprey, she had five children. Three survived to adulthood: Luis Enrique, Borinquen, and America.

The family moved to the capital of San Juan, where she became the first woman to be permitted into the Puerto Rican Athenaeum and the first woman to become a member of the Public Library.  During her spare time, she composed music. In 1880 her husband died, leaving her with young children to care for.

Author and publisher
In 1884, Roqué was offered a teacher's position in Arecibo, which she accepted.  She also enrolled at the Provincial Institute where she studied philosophy and science and earned her bachelor's degree. In 1899, Roque was appointed as the director of the Normal School of San Juan.

In 1898, Roqué founded La Mujer, the first "women's only" magazine in Puerto Rico.  She also wrote articles for the following newspapers: El Buscapie, El Imparcial and El Mundo.  She founded other women's publications and some of general interest: La Evolucion (1902), La Mujer del Siglo XX in (1907), Album Puertorriqueño (1918) and Heraldo de la Mujer (1920).

In addition to articles, Roqué wrote several books, both fiction and non-fiction. They include the following: Sara, La Obrera and Luz y Sombra.  Her book Puerto Rican Flora received acclaim and an award from the Fourth Century Christian Civilization Organization. Roque, who also had a passion for astronomy, was made an honorary member of the Paris Society of Astronomers.

In the early 1900s, Roqué also began work on the study Botánica Antillana, a study of Caribbean flora in which she documented over 6,000 species of plants with color illustrations as well as medicinal and agricultural properties.

Founder of University of Puerto Rico-Mayagüez Campus
In 1902, Roqué founded a teachers' academy in her house. Roqué also taught and prepared students for their teacher's examination with the Department of Education. As a result of her growing interest in education, Roqué founded the Liceo Ponceño (a girls' high school in Ponce) and the College of Mayagüez. (The latter developed as the Mayagüez Campus of the University of Puerto Rico). She also contributed to the founding of the University of Puerto Rico campus in San Juan.

Feminist
In 1917, Roqué and other professional women founded the Puerto Rican Feminist League, the first feminist organization in Puerto Rico dedicated to the issues of women's rights. In 1921 it focused on voting rights as the Suffragist Social League. By 1924, the women had divided over political differences, and Roque led followers to found the Association of Women Suffragists. They fought for women's suffrage without restrictions (such as literacy or means tests). The first phase was approved in 1932 and in 1935, all women of voting age were allowed to vote.

Legacy and honors
In 1932, the University of Puerto Rico awarded Roque an honorary doctorate degree. She was also named honorary president of the Puerto Rican Liberal Party.

In 1933, Ana Roqué Géigel de Duprey died in Río Piedras, and a memorial has been done to honor her life. A high school in Humacao, Puerto Rico and a street in San Juan are named for her.  An elementary school in Chicago, Illinois, which has a large Puerto Rican population, is named after her.

Roque was posthumously named an honoree of the National Women's History Alliance in 2020.

See also

 List of Puerto Ricans
 French immigration to Puerto Rico
 History of women in Puerto Rico

References

External links
 Weekly World

1853 births
1933 deaths
Puerto Rican educators
Puerto Rican feminists
People from Aguadilla, Puerto Rico
Puerto Rican people of French descent
Puerto Rican activists
Puerto Rican suffragists